John Leo Hargreaves (born 27 April 1949) is a retired Australian politician. He was a Labor Party member of the Australian Capital Territory Legislative Assembly from 1998 to 2012. In 2006, he stepped down as Transport Minister after he was charged with a drink driving offense. He acted as Minister for Territory and Municipal Services, Minister for Multicultural Affairs and Minister for Housing.

On 12 October 2009 Hargreaves announced his resignation as Minister from the Labor Cabinet although he stated that he intended to continue in his role as MLA for Brindabella.  He retired from politics in 2012.

External links
John Hargreaves, Member of the ACT Legislative Assembly(contact details)

References

Australian Labor Party members of the Australian Capital Territory Legislative Assembly
1949 births
Living people
Members of the Australian Capital Territory Legislative Assembly
21st-century Australian politicians